The Wine of Summer is a 2013 romantic drama film written, directed and produced by Maria Matteoli, starring Elsa Pataky, Sônia Braga, Ethan Peck, Najwa Nimri, Bob Wells and Marcia Gay Harden.

Plot
James (Peck), at the age of 27 quits his law career in pursuit of his childhood dream of becoming an actor. While studying acting under the tutelage of Shelley (Harden), he becomes engrossed in Carlo Lucchesi's play, Tinto de Verano, which is set in Spain. James’ girlfriend Brit (Chow) leaves him, and he spontaneously flies to Spain, where he encounters the playwright Lucchesi (Wells) at a bookstore in Barcelona. Lucchesi is in a relationship with a much younger woman, Veronica (Pataky), but still nurtures an old love for his long lost muse, Eliza (Braga), a novelist, who happens to be visiting her son, Nico (Talvola) a trumpet player who also lives in Barcelona. In the golden backdrop of Spain, these characters find their fates intertwined.

Cast
Elsa Pataky as Veronica
Sônia Braga as Eliza
Ethan Peck as James
Najwa Nimri as Ana
Bob Wells as Carlo
Marcia Gay Harden as Shelley
Kelsey Asbille as Brit
Jonathan D. Mellor as Henry
Mimi Gianopulos as Nina
Michael Scott Allen as Michael
Dominic Allburn as Roberto
Francesc Prat as Frankie
Afrika Bibang as Serafina
Nicholas Dominic Talvola as Nico
Andrea L. Hart as Nicole

Production

Filming
Filming started in October 2011 and was shot on location in Barcelona, Spain and Eureka, California.

Release
The film was shown at the 2013 Douro Film Harvest in Portugal.

References

External links
 
 

2013 films
2013 romantic drama films
Films shot in Barcelona
Films set in Spain
Films set in Barcelona
Films shot in California